Lumina Foundation is a private, Indianapolis-based foundation with about $1.4 billion in assets. Since its founding in August 2000, Lumina has made grants totaling more than $250 million.

History
Lumina Foundation is a conversion foundation created in mid-2000 as USA Group, Inc., which sold most of its operating assets to the Student Loan Marketing Association, Inc. (Sallie Mae). Proceeds from the sale established the USA Group Foundation with an endowment of $770M. The foundation was renamed Lumina Foundation for Education in February 2001.

Lumina's early grant making efforts provided start-up funding for three initiatives: Achieving the Dream: Community Colleges Count; KnowHow2GO, a college-access campaign; and College Productivity, formerly known as Making Opportunity Affordable.

Presidents
 Martha Lamkin 2000-2007
 Jamie P. Merisotis 2007–present

References

External links
 Lumina Foundation Web site
 College Grants
 Organizational Profile – National Center for Charitable Statistics (Urban Institute)

Educational foundations in the United States
Organizations established in 2000
Non-profit organizations based in Indianapolis
2000 establishments in Indiana